John William Power (4 February 1816 – 12 May 1851), sometimes described as the 17th Baron Le Power and Coroghmore,  was an Irish politician.

The son of Edmund Power, and stepson of Richard L. Shiel, Power was born in Castle Gurteen de la Poer.  He stood in the 1837 Dungarvan by-election, and won the seat, as a Whig.  In the 1837 UK general election, he instead stood in County Waterford, winning the seat without facing a contest.  In 1840, he stood down by taking the office of the Chiltern Hundreds.  Power also served as a deputy lieutenant and a magistrate.

References

1816 births
1851 deaths
People from County Waterford
UK MPs 1835–1837
UK MPs 1837–1841